Dorothea Dieckmann is a German writer.

Biography
Dorothea Dieckmann was born in Freiburg in 1957. She has lived in Hamburg, Cologne, Rome, Tübingen and Stuttgart. Prior to becoming a full-time writer Diechmann worked as a high school teacher.

Her novel Guantanamo was her first to be translated into English.
When Tim Mohr translated the novel into English, he won the Best Translated Book Award.

Awards and honours
She is a recipient of the 1990 Literature Prize of the City of Hamburg.  In 1997, she received the Künstlerhaus Schloss Wiepersdorf scholarship.  In 1998, she received the Marburger Literaturpreis. In 2004, she received a scholarship from Ledig House. In 2009, she was chosen to be Dresden's writer in residence.

References

External links
 Works by or about Dorothea Dieckmann in the catalog of the German National Library
 Short biography and reviews of works by Dorothea Dieckmann at perlentaucher.de
 http://www.digitab.de/home/vita/dodivi_0.htm
 http://bachmannpreis.orf.at/bachmannpreis/texte/stories/14244/
 http://www.single-generation.de/kohorten/dorothea_dieckmann.htm

1957 births
Living people
German women novelists
Writers from Freiburg im Breisgau
20th-century German novelists
20th-century German women writers
21st-century German novelists
21st-century German women writers
German women essayists
German essayists
20th-century German non-fiction writers
20th-century essayists
21st-century German non-fiction writers
21st-century essayists